A Blue Tory in Canadian politics is a conservative who advocates for free-market or economically liberal policies. The term has been applied to members of the modern Conservative Party of Canada and provincial Progressive Conservative parties, as well as the historical Progressive Conservative Party of Canada, Reform Party of Canada and Canadian Alliance. In contemporary language, Blue Tories are sometimes described as a "true-blue Conservative".

History 
Prior to the 1960s, these conservatives were most identified with the Montreal and Toronto commercial elite who took positions of influence within the Progressive Conservative Party. Since the mid-1970s, they have been heavily influenced by the libertarian movement and the more individualist nature of American conservatism. Blue Tories tend to favour market-oriented economic policies such as devolution of federal power to the provincial governments, a reduced role for government in the economy, reduction of taxation and similar mainstream market liberal ideals. They also advocate self reliance, individual responsibility, personal freedom and liberty and therefore do not necessarily support social conservatism.

One example of a Blue Tory government in Canada was the "Common Sense Revolution" provincial Progressive Conservative government of Ontario Premier Mike Harris.  The Harris Tories were widely viewed as radical by Canadian standards in their economic policies and style of governance. Harris' government embarked on a number of initiatives, including cuts to education, welfare and Medicare, privatization of government services and health care, the sale of provincial highways and the forced amalgamation of municipalities. Provincial income taxes were also cut by 30% and corporate tax rates were nearly cut in half during the Harris mandate.

Most Blue Tories are at least somewhat ideologically aligned close to the economically liberal positions of the former Canadian Alliance and as such supported the merger between the PCs and the Alliance to form the new federal Conservative Party of Canada (CPC).

Notable adherents  
Notable Blue Tories include:

 Mike Harris, Premier of Ontario (1995–2002)
 Stephen Harper, Prime Minister of Canada (2006–2015)
 Ralph Klein, Premier of Alberta (1992–2006)
 Preston Manning, former leader of the Reform Party
 Brian Mulroney, Prime Minister of Canada (1984–1993)

See also 
 Conservatism in Canada
 Fiscal conservatism
 Red Tory
 Small-c conservative
 Blue Grit

References 

Conservative Party of Canada
Political party factions in Canada
Conservatism in Canada
Progressive Conservative Party of Canada
Conservative Party of Canada (1867–1942)
Toryism